"Wrist" is a song by American hip hop recording artist Logic. It serves as the second single from his sixth mixtape Bobby Tarantino, and was released through Visionary Music Group and Def Jam Recordings on June 24, 2016. The song features vocals from rapper Pusha T, and was produced by Logic and 6ix. The song is also featured in the video game Madden NFL 17.

Background
This song is a fictional story told by Logic, which follows the premise of a Colombian drug lord who is reflecting on his personal decisions during a military raid of his compound. In turn, Pusha T details the effect of that cocaine trickling into the hands of a young man presumably himself in the American projects whom in return, is distributing it as crack.

Charts

Certifications

Release history

References

External links

Lyrics of this song at Genius

2016 singles
2016 songs
Logic (rapper) songs
Def Jam Recordings singles
Songs written by Pusha T
Pusha T songs
Songs written by Logic (rapper)
Songs written by 6ix (record producer)